San Michele Salentino is a comune in the province of Brindisi in Apulia, on the south-east Italian coast. Its main economic activities are the growing of olives and grapes.

International relations

 
San Michele Salentino is twinned with:
 Monte Sant'Angelo, Italy (since 2007)

References

External links 
 San Michele Salentino  -Salento high coast of the trulli  

Cities and towns in Apulia
Localities of Salento